Colcom Foundation is an anti-immigration private foundation established in 1996 by Cordelia Scaife May, a Mellon family heiress.  The Foundation is one of the main sources of funding for the anti-immigration movement in the United States.  Several of the groups funded by the Colcom Foundation have been designated as hate groups by the Southern Poverty Law Center (SPLC), including American Border Patrol, the Center for Immigration Studies (CIS), and the Federation for American Immigration Reform (FAIR).

The foundation also focuses on population control, environmental conservation, and  civic and environmental projects, especially in the Pittsburgh, Pennsylvania area where it is based.

Anti-immigration advocacy
The Colcom Foundation is one of the main financial supporters of the anti-immigration movement in the United States, providing more than $150 million to such groups since 2005. According to IRS documents, in 2016 58% of the money that Colcom gave went to anti-immigrant groups. In 2017, more than 80% went to anti-immigrant groups. Several of the groups funded by the Colcom Foundation have been designated as hate groups by the Southern Poverty Law Center (SPLC), including American Border Patrol, the Center for Immigration Studies (CIS), and the Federation for American Immigration Reform (FAIR).

In 2020, immigrant rights activists launched a campaign to discourage Pittsburgh-area civic and environmental groups from accepting money from the Colcom Foundation. Several organizations, including Group Against Smog and Pollution (GASP), Southwest Pennsylvania Environmental Health Project, and American Rivers, subsequently severed their ties to the foundation.

Civic and environmental projects 
Grants have supported projects such as the planters throughout Downtown Pittsburgh,  recycling hard-to-dispose waste, conservation of Sycamore Island in the Allegheny River,  matching funds to activate Pittsburgh’s downtown streets in the Paris to Pittsburgh Project, water quality studies in the Monongahela River,  revolving loan fund enabling land trusts to rapidly consummate vital land conservancy projects,  Marcellus Environmental Fund to assess and address risks of shale drilling,  Mt. Washington land conservation,  Tribute to Children monument honoring Mister Rogers, Kids Zone at the Three Rivers Regatta,  support for the 2009 G20 Pittsburgh summit,  completing a bridge for bicyclists on the Great Allegheny Passage near Pittsburgh, curatorial salaries for the Carnegie Museum of Natural History,  and matching funds to renovate the fountain at historic Point State Park.

References

External links 
 Colcom Foundation

Conservation and environmental foundations in the United States
1996 establishments in Pennsylvania
Organizations established in 1996